Sor Piseth (born 8 August 1992) is a Cambodian footballer who plays as a defender for National Defense Ministry and  the Cambodia national football team.

References

Cambodian footballers
Cambodia international footballers
1992 births
Living people
Association football defenders
Place of birth missing (living people)
21st-century Cambodian people